Oren Zeev is an Israeli-American venture capitalist and head of Zeev Ventures, a Silicon Valley-based venture capital firm with early-round investments in technology companies. Zeev has had notable investments in Houzz, Audible, Chegg, TripActions, and Tipalti. He is co-founder and co-chairman of ICON, a non-profit organization focused on bridging Israeli and Silicon Valley technology and business.

Engineering career
Zeev graduated BsC Cum Laude, EE from Technion-Machon Technologi Le’ Israel, and earned an MBA with Distinction in Business from INSEAD in France.

Zeev developed and implemented image and signal processing algorithms prior to his career as a venture capitalist. He was a Research staff member at IBM and part of the founding team of IBM's chip design group in Haifa, Israel.

Investment career
Following his time at IBM, Zeev spent 12 years at Apax Partners as a General Partner. He joined in January 1995 as part of the founding team of Apax Israel. In 2002, Zeev moved to the US and co-headed, and later headed, the Technology Practice of Apax and its Silicon Valley office. His first investment was Audible where he was also a board member.

Zeev Ventures
In 2007, Zeev established Zeev Ventures in Palo Alto to focus on early-stage companies. At Zeev Ventures, he has been an early investor and has held board and chairmanships at various companies including Houzz, Chegg, Homelight, Tipalti, TripActions, and NEXT Insurance. For Houzz, Zeev led the Series A round in the company in 2010, and then invested another $20 million from his fund, Zeev Ventures, expanding on the 8% of the company he already owned.

Tipalti
In 2010, Zeev Co-founded Tipalti when another one of Zeev's portfolio companies approached him with a major challenge they were facing around processing payouts to their global partners. To explore and address this problem, Zeev recruited Chen Amit, who he had studied and gotten his MBA with while at INSEAD, to create and run the company. Tipalti now processes over $11 billion in annual transaction for over 1,000 clients and over 4 million suppliers around the world.

In 2014, Zeev was featured in Techcrunch on his investment approach that has achieved an annual 100 percent IRR.

In 2017, Forbes wrote an article about Zeev's unique investment approach that had led to such a high portfolio success rate.

In 2019, Zeev was profiled by CNBC on how he chooses start-ups for investment.

Personal life
Zeev was born in Haifa, Israel in 1964. He moved to California with his wife, Hagit Zeev, and 2 children in 2002. Zeev currently lives in Los Altos Hills, California.

List of startup investments
 Houzz
 Audible
 Chegg
 TripActions
 Tipalti
 Homelight
 Duda
 Crossrider
 Wibiya
 Next Insurance
 Loop Commerce
 AngelSense
 Redkix
 vFunction
 Reali
 Seal
 Domestika
 Uber Freight
 Hippo Insurance
 Stackbit
 ProteanTecs
 UpNine
 Explorium
 Fieldin
 Veev
 Sunbit
 Firebolt
 Uniper
 Treeverse
 dLocal

References

External links
Zeev Ventures

1964 births
American business executives
Angel investors
American people of Israeli descent
Israeli financial businesspeople
Living people